Insaf is a 1973 Bollywood film directed by Adurthi Subba Rao. It stars Waheeda Rehman, Vijay Arora, Tanuja in lead roles.

Cast
 Waheeda Rehman as Janki
 Vijay Arora as Shankar
 Tanuja as Uma
 Aruna Irani as Asha
 Pran as Shekhar / Kanhaiya (Double Role)
 Meena T. as Hema
 Ravindra Kapoor as Raju
 Manmohan Krishna as Judge

Soundtrack
"Rang Bhari Raate Pyaar Bhari Shaame" - Kishore Kumar, Lata Mangeshkar
"Maine Pyaar Kiya Main Pachtayi" - Lata Mangeshkar
"Mem Shaab Mem Shaab" - Lata Mangeshkar, Kishore Kumar
"Mera Naam Mai Tera Naam Tu" - Shailendra Singh, Asha Bhosle
"Tu Kathputli Naach Mere Hath teri dor" - Asha Bhosle

External links
 

1973 films
Films scored by Laxmikant–Pyarelal
1970s Hindi-language films
Films directed by Adurthi Subba Rao